The Barret House, at 	204 S. Elm St. in Henderson, Kentucky, was built in c.1868.  It was listed on the National Register of Historic Places in 1978.

It is an "imposing Italianate villa" built for William T. Barret, a successful tobacconist.

It is a contributing building in the South Main and South Elm Streets Historic District, which was listed on the National Register in 1992.

References

Houses on the National Register of Historic Places in Kentucky
Italianate architecture in Kentucky
Houses completed in 1868
National Register of Historic Places in Henderson County, Kentucky
Individually listed contributing properties to historic districts on the National Register in Kentucky
Henderson, Kentucky